"Buggin" is a song by UK garage duo True Steppers featuring singer Dane Bowers of Another Level. It was released as a single on 17 April 2000 and was a top-10 hit in the United Kingdom, peaking at  6 on the UK Singles Chart and No. 2 on the UK Dance Singles Chart.

Track listings
UK CD single
 "Buggin" (radio edit)
 "Buggin"
 "Buggin" (10° Below vocal dub)

UK cassette single
 "Buggin"
 "Buggin" (radio edit)

Charts

References

2000 songs
2000 singles
Dane Bowers songs
True Steppers songs
NuLife singles